Annat is a village at the head of Upper Loch Torridon in Argyll and Bute, Scotland.

References

Villages in Argyll and Bute